Marion County is a county in the U.S. state of Iowa. As of the 2020 census, the population was 33,414. The county seat is Knoxville. It is named for Francis Marion, a brigadier general from South Carolina in the American Revolutionary War.

Geography

Major highways
 Iowa Highway 5
 Iowa Highway 14
 Iowa Highway 92
 Iowa Highway 163
 Iowa Highway 316

Adjacent counties
Jasper County  (north)
Mahaska County  (east)
Monroe County  (southeast)
Lucas County  (southwest)
Warren County  (west)

Demographics

2020 census
There were 14,073 housing units, of which 13,145 were occupied.

2010 census
There were 13,914 housing units, of which 12,723 were occupied.

2000 census

As of the census of 2000, there were 32,052 people, 12,017 households, and 8,532 families residing in the county. The population density was 58 people per square mile (22/km2).  There were 12,755 housing units at an average density of 23 per square mile (9/km2).  The racial makeup of the county was 97.46% White, 0.42% Black or African American, 0.19% Native American, 1.03% Asian, 0.04% Pacific Islander, 0.22% from other races, and 0.64% from two or more races. 0.80% of the population were Hispanic or Latino of any race.

There were 12,017 households, out of which 33.00% had children under the age of 18 living with them, 61.20% were married couples living together, 6.90% had a female householder with no husband present, and 29.00% were non-families. 25.60% of all households were made up of individuals, and 11.90% had someone living alone who was 65 years of age or older.  The average household size was 2.50 and the average family size was 3.02.

In the county, the population was spread out, with 25.30% under the age of 18, 10.20% from 18 to 24, 26.50% from 25 to 44, 22.10% from 45 to 64, and 15.90% who were 65 years of age or older. The median age was 37 years. For every 100 females there were 98.60 males. For every 100 females age 18 and over, there were 95.80 males.

The median income for a household in the county was $42,401, and the median income for a family was $50,052. Males had a median income of $36,460 versus $25,573 for females. The per capita income for the county was $18,717. About 5.20% of families and 7.60% of the population were below the poverty line, including 8.70% of those under age 18 and 10.80% of those age 65 or over.

Communities

Cities

Bussey
Hamilton
Harvey
Knoxville
Marysville
Melcher-Dallas
Pella
Pleasantville
Swan

Unincorporated communities

Attica
Cloud
Columbia
Flagler
Otley
Pershing
Tracy

Townships

 Clay
 Dallas
 Franklin
 Indiana
 Knoxville
 Lake Prairie
 Liberty
 Pleasant Grove
 Red Rock
 Summit
 Union
 Washington

Population ranking

The population ranking of the following table is based on the 2020 census of Marion County.

† county seat

Gallery

Politics

See also

National Register of Historic Places listings in Marion County, Iowa

References

External links

Official Marion County, Iowa Website

 
1845 establishments in Iowa Territory
Populated places established in 1845